The Waterworks Museum is a museum in the Chestnut Hill Waterworks building, originally a high-service pumping station of the Boston Metropolitan Waterworks.  It contains well-preserved mechanical engineering devices in a Richardsonian Romanesque building.

During its busiest years, the waterworks pumped as much as a hundred million gallons of water each day. The station was decommissioned in the 1970s, and later some of its buildings were turned into condominiums. After a period of disuse, the pumping station was restored, and in 2007 the Waterworks Preservation Trust was set up to oversee its conversion into a museum. In March 2011, the building reopened to the public as the Waterworks Museum.

History 

In the 1850s, Boston began modernizing its water supply, which at the time was a combination of wells, pond water, and downhill piping from a Natick reservoir.

In the 1870s, Boston city leaders decided the city needed to scale up its water filtration and pumping and began looking into options.

In 1886, this 'high service' pumping station was designed, and the next year it came online as the Chestnut Hill pumping station - only a few years after the first such station in the world, in Germany. Water was pumped from this station uphill to the Fisher Hill reservoir, where gravity would then push the water to the surrounding area.

In 1894, the station put its third water pump into operation: a steam-powered water pump designed by Erasmus Darwin Leavitt. The Leavitt-Riedler Pumping Engine, as it was later called, was promoted as "the most efficient pumping engine in the world" it was first unveiled, and remained in operation through 1928. In the 20th century it was declared a historic mechanical engineering landmark by the American Society of Mechanical Engineers. It was fully restored by the museum and is the centerpiece of its main floor.

Trivia 
Mark Wahlberg filmed part of his 1992 "You Gotta Believe" in the basement of the building.

The building contains the stonework faces of its designer, Arthur H. Vinal, and his wife.

Gallery

See also 
 Chestnut Hill Reservoir Historic District
 Leavitt-Riedler Pumping Engine

References

Further reading

External links

Chestnut Hill, Massachusetts
Historic American Engineering Record in Massachusetts
Museums in Boston